Frank Pettitt (16 October 1899 – 27 March 1964) was an English stage, film and television actor. He played Albert Finney's father in the film Saturday Night and Sunday Morning (1960).

Filmography 
 Night and the City  (1950) - Cabby (uncredited)
 Face the Music (1954) - Constable (uncredited)
 The Heart Within (1957) - 3rd Constable
 Saturday Night and Sunday Morning (1960) - Mr. Seaton
 The Kitchen (1961) - Frank
 Victim (1961) - Barman 
 The Pot Carriers (1962) - Van Driver
 Serena (1962) - Fred 
 Impact (1963) - Sid the foreman
 A Matter of Choice (1963) - Police Sergeant

References

External links 

1899 births
1964 deaths
English male stage actors
English male film actors
English male television actors